The MXS is a single-seat aerobatic aircraft made of carbon fiber and built by MX Aircraft Company, a 
manufacturer located at Jandakot Airport in Perth, Western Australia. The MXS-R is a race variant flown by several pilots in the Red Bull Air Race World Championship. The planes are all-composite in construction, piston-powered, low-wing monoplanes. They are produced both in kit form for amateur construction, and completed ready to fly at the factory. 

The MXS has won an entire decade of US Nationals Aerobatic Championships and World 4 Minute Free Style Championships and is regarded as the highest performance aerobatic airplane in the world. Pilot Rob Holland won the Eric Muller Trophy flying a MXS at the 2019 World Aerobatic championships. 

The two-seat version is called the MX2 and has reached notable fame, becoming World Aerobatic Advanced Champion under the control of Rob Holland (pilot) in 2008 and also vice-world aerobatics advanced champion in 2010.

Specifications

See also

References

External links 

Official Website
Red Bull Air Race

Low-wing aircraft
2000s United States sport aircraft
Aerobatic aircraft
Single-engined tractor aircraft